Yakut is both a given name and a surname. Notable people with the name include:

Given name
 Yakut Khan (before 1672-1733), Indian general who invaded Bombay in 1689
 Yakut al-Hamawi (1179-1229), Syrian slave turned ethnographer & geographer

Surname
 Jamal ud-Din Yakut (before 1200-1240), Abyssinian slave, close adviser & alleged lover of Razia Sultana, first female monarch of Delhi Sultanate of India
 Mehmet Vasıf Yakut, Turkish Para Taekwondo practitioner
 Şahin Yakut (1979-), Turkish kickboxer 

Turkish-language surnames